Mayesburg is an unincorporated community in Bates County, in the U.S. state of Missouri.

History
Mayesburg was laid out in 1878, and most likely was named in honor of J. M. Mayes, a local merchant. A post office called Mayesburgh was established in 1879, and remained in operation until 1902.

References

Unincorporated communities in Bates County, Missouri
Unincorporated communities in Missouri